The 2010 AFC Women's Asian Cup was held from 19–30 May at the Chengdu Sports Centre in China PR. The winners, Australia, runners-up, Korea DPR, and third-place team, Japan qualified for the 2011 FIFA Women's World Cup.

With this victory, Australia women's had become the first ever national team to win in two different confederations, having won the OFC Women's Nations Cup three times before. Their success was later followed by their fellow men's team at the men's tournament less than 5 years later.

Qualification
Direct entry
 
 
 
 
 

Via qualification

  (Winner Group A)
  (Winner Group B)
  (Winner Group C)

Squads

Match officials
A total of 9 referees and 9 assistant referees were appointed for the final tournament.

Referees

 Jacqui Melksham
 Li Hong
 Wang Jia
 Bentla D'Coth
 Yamagishi Sachiko
 Ri Hyang-ok
 Hong Eun-ah
 Pannipar Kamnueng
 Semaksuk Praew

Assistant referees

 Sarah Ho
 Clare Flynn
 Zhang Lingling
 Liu Hsiu-mei
 Saori Takahashi
 Shiho Ayukai
 Widiya Habibah binti Shamsuri
 Hong Kum-nyo
 Kim Kyoung-min

Group stages
The two groups were drawn on 21 November 2009 in Kuala Lumpur, Malaysia.

Group A

Group B

Knockout stages

Semi-finals
Winners qualified for 2011 FIFA Women's World Cup.

Third place match
Winner qualified for 2011 FIFA Women's World Cup.

Final

Awards

Goalscorers

Tournament teams ranking

See also
 Women's association football
 Asian Football Confederation (AFC)
 AFC Women's Asian Cup

References

External links
 Tournament website
 RSSSF.com

 
2010
2011 FIFA Women's World Cup qualification
Women
2010
Afc
2010 in Chinese football
2010 in Japanese women's football
2010 in North Korean football
2009–10 in Australian women's soccer
2010 in South Korean football
2010 in Thai football
2010 in Burmese football
2010 in Vietnamese football
2010 in Chinese women's sport
May 2010 sports events in China
2010 in Thai women's sport